e-Pro (styled e-PRO) is an Internet professional certification program approved by the National Association of Realtors (NAR) for its members.  Members of the Canadian Real Estate Association (CREA) may also pursue the e-Pro certification and use the logo by completing the online learning program.

The four core areas of study (arranged in modules) are:
 Internet fundamentals (e.g., Internet service providers, electronic mailing lists, domain names, and DNS).
 E-mail communication methods and strategies for clients/customers.
 The World Wide Web and its uses in developing a real estate business.
 Other technology (hardware and software, both general purpose and real estate industry-specific).

The course material prior to 2010 was based on the Real Estate Technology Guide.

In 2010 the entire e-Pro course was re-written by Bill Lublin and his team at the Social Media Marketing Institute. The new course was the winner of the 2011 Award for best educational offering from the Real Estate Educators Association (REEA).

See also
Real estate professional designations

References

External links
 

Information technology qualifications
Professional titles and certifications
Real estate in North America